Amiche mie (English: My Friends) is a 2008 Italian television series, originally broadcast on Canale 5. The series follows Anna (Margherita Buy) who becomes dissatisfied with her family life and writes to famous gynecologist and sexologist Giorgio Monesi (Guido Caprino), known as "Dr. G", for advice.

Cast
 Margherita Buy: Anna
 Elena Sofia Ricci: Francesca
 Luisa Ranieri: Marta
 Cecilia Dazzi: Grazia
 Guido Caprino: Giorgio
 Elena Russo: Vanessa
 Katie McGovern: Fortune teller
 Stefano Pesce: Federico
 Gaia Bermani Amaral: Lulu
 Pino Quartullo: Vasco
 Franco Neri: Lino
 Barbara Bouchet: Mariella
 Lillo Petrolo: Filippo
 Michele Balducci: Bea's boyfriend

See also
List of Italian television series

External links
 

Italian television series
Canale 5 original programming